Howard Higman (April 25, 1915 – November 22, 1995) was an American sociologist notable as the founder of the Conference on World Affairs in 1948.

References

1915 births
1995 deaths
American sociologists
People from Boulder, Colorado